The Aldabra Island day gecko, or Aldabra day gecko (Phelsuma abbotti abbotti), has been found on the Aldabra Atoll (Seychelles).  It lives on low trees and bushes and eats insects and fruit.

References

Phelsuma
Fauna of Seychelles
Subspecies
Taxa named by Leonhard Stejneger